Gerónimo "Gerry" Lluberas (January 7, 1956 – May 7, 2003) was a Puerto Rican physician, humanitarian, writer and composer. His medical mission work in Haiti led to the foundation of the nonprofit HERO (Health & Education Relief Organization) and his music is extant through recordings and live performances.

Life and profession
José Gerónimo Lluberas Acosta was the first of four boys born to attorney Gerónimo Lluberas-Kells and artisan Clara Acosta-Recurt. He spent his early childhood in his parents' birthplace of Ponce, Puerto Rico. The family later settled in Carolina, near San Juan, Puerto Rico. He attended Roman Catholic parochial schools, took private accordion lessons and taught himself guitar.  He showed an aptitude for the natural sciences, and he was eventually to earn a doctorate in medicine at the Universidad Central del Caribe in Cayey and to pursue a career as a rheumatologist.

He married Magali Huertas Amil in 1978 and the couple adopted two children in Bogotá, Colombia: Gerónimo Orlando in 1984 and Cristina Marcela in 1987.

Lluberas led an active religious life and, through his church, organized medical missions to Haiti. His first trip attracted local and international media attention when Lluberas and his team were stranded for several days in Belle Anse after roads and bridges were washed out by Hurricane Georges. They were eventually airlifted out by helicopter.

Lluberas published research papers in an array of medical journals and also wrote fiction. He composed dozens of Christian songs and studied painting and drawing.

At age 46, Lluberas was diagnosed with "unknown primary site" cancer and began chemotherapy. He died the following year. He was interred at Borinquen Memorial Cemetery in Caguas, Puerto Rico.

Medical career
In 1976, after completing his undergraduate degree at the University of Puerto Rico in Río Piedras, Lluberas enrolled in the School of Medicine at the Universidad Central del Caribe. He was a member of the school's first graduating class, earning his MD in 1980.

He did his internship at Frankford Hospital, in Philadelphia, Pennsylvania; residency in Internal Medicine at the Medical College of Pennsylvania; and specialty in Rheumatology at the Veterans Administration Medical Center/University of Pennsylvania Hospital. He practiced medicine and headed the internship program at Frankford Hospital.

In 1985, he co-authored his first professional journal article, on clinical research related to gout.

In 1988, he accepted a position at the Lupus Center in Atlanta, Georgia. He later established a private practice in Marietta, Georgia and treated patients with rheumatoid arthritis, lupus, Paget's disease, ankylosing spondylitis, and Sjögren's syndrome.
 He was one of the first physicians to use the Prosorba column to treat rheumatoid arthritis.

He reflected his clinical experience and research interests in his professional journal writings which focused on Paget's disease, gonococcal arthritis and meningitis, pyoarthritis, pseudolupus, chronic pain and rheumatoid arthritis.

Lluberas also taught in the Nurse Practitioner Program at Kennesaw State University and was associated with Kennestone Hospital, later WellStar Kennestone .

Beginning in September 1998, Lluberas organized and led medical relief trips to Belle Anse, Haiti. During their first trip, Lluberas and his team examined about 400 patients with malnutrition, high-blood pressure, and diseases caused by poor sanitation and water pollution, and collected clinical data from 315 of these patients on hypertension prevalence.

By April 2000,  Lluberas and his teams had delivered basic health care to about 2,300 people in Belle Anse, saved the life of a four-month-old girl with meningitis, and rehabilitated patients with major injuries.

Humanitarian legacy
Lluberas wrote that, "Missionary work...[is] the only way to act when one refuses to sit by and do nothing to alleviate--however slightly--the plight [of poverty and disease] of our brethren."
 
In late 1997, Lluberas outlined a plan for medical mission work in Belle Anse, Haiti, that included building an improvised clinic to provide pre-natal care, vaccines for childhood diseases and Hepatitis A and Hepatitis B, rehydration and eye care, and making "house calls" to local chapels. He identified the lack of safe water as the town's major underlying health care problem.

While stranded in the wake of Hurricane Georges during his first mission to Belle Anse, Lluberas documented the impact of the storm on local roads, bridges, water systems, health, housing and agriculture.  Lluberas and his team returned to Belle Anse a year later despite safety concerns stemming from political instability in Haiti.  Following his third trip, in 2000, Lluberas outlined other initiatives to aid Belle Anse including delivering clothing and equipment, fixing the town's electric generator, upgrading the water supply, building a school and developing a wharf.

In June 2000, Lluberas suggested starting a nonprofit organization to fund future medical missions and sponsor a full-time doctor in Belle Anse.  This proposal and Lluberas' comprehensive view of Belle Anse's needs laid the groundwork for the creation in 2003 of the nonprofit HERO (Health & Education Relief Organization) to build clinics, schools and basic infrastructure throughout the country.

His humanitarian legacy is also evident in the establishment in December 2006 of the Gerónimo Lluberas Collection, a medical library at Hôpital Sacré Coeur in Milot, Haiti. As noted in the text of a plaque on display at the entrance to the Green Tower Satellite Medical Staff Library of WellStar Kennestone Hospital in Marietta, Georgia, the delivery of Lluberas' medical books to the hospital in Milot was made possible by Kennestone Hospital and the Pray It Forward Foundation , "in loving memory" of Lluberas, "faithful servant of God, husband, father, physician, teacher and medical missionary to the people of Haiti."

Musical career
As a child in Puerto Rico, Lluberas  studied the accordion with George Kudirka and continued his musical education with Luis Espindola  . Later, this avocation helped to pay for medical school. He played the accordion with the popular dance band "Calorías '76" which he formed and led.

In 1988 he composed his first piece that is still performed today, the danceable Puerto Rican Christmas song "Aguinaldo del Cañaveral." After joining Transfiguration Roman Catholic Church in Marietta, Georgia, in 1989, he became active in the music ministry, working with conductor Rod Voss. He also furthered his musical training, studying piano, music theory and composition.

By 2000 he was composing music for, and playing the accordion and guitar with, the «Camino de Fe» choir at St. Ann Catholic Church, also in Marietta. He wrote "Camino de Fe" and "By the Lord's Word", among other songs that employed Caribbean rhythms. For use as Parts of the Mass, he composed "Aclamación de las Naciones" and "Amén de las Naciones". In 2001, he began performing at St. Ann's «Opera Night» series.

Influenced by Andrew Lloyd Webber, Rodgers and Hammerstein, Georges Bizet, Giacomo Puccini, and forms from his native Puerto Rico, Lluberas wrote the libretto, music and lyrics for a full-length musical theatre work «Butterflies in the Rain Forest, A Christian Musical» (2001), inspired in part by his trips to Haiti.

Lluberas' secular songs include "Mendigo" and the poignant danza "Desdeño."

In 2002, after he was diagnosed with cancer, he edited the songbook «Camino de Fe, Worship Compositions», a selected anthology of his works. As his illness progressed, he started work on «Suite on a Neutropenic State» for oboe, string quintet and timpani, dedicated "To all on chemotherapy and their loves ones."

At his request, his meditative compositions "Lord, I Surrender to You" (2002) and "On My Knees" (2001) were sung at his funeral.

Posthumously, excerpts and an abridged version of «Butterflies in the Rain Forest, A Christian Musical» have been presented in concert form.

In 2006, HERO Records released a CD of Gerónimo Lluberas' music titled «Butterflies in the Rain Forest/Music for Meditation & Celebration» . It includes performances by, among others, singers J.J. Hobbs , Christopher Crommett and Victor Ryan Robertson  (credits: Baz Luhrmann's La bohème, Royal Albert Hall, Dallas Opera, and Los Angeles Opera), and arranger/saxophonist Gary Anderson ,  pianist Ed Bolduc , trumpeter Forrest Buchtel  (credits: Count Basie, Blood, Sweat & Tears, Duke Ellington, Woody Herman, and Malo), arranger/pianist Michael Fauss  (Alliance Theatre Company), flautist Cristina Lluberas, and the «Camino de Fe» choir.

Lluberas' song "Aguinaldo del cañaveral", in an arrangement by Gary Anderson  for symphony orchestra, vocal quartet and tenor soloist, is featured on the CD «Navidad de mi niñez»  which was scheduled to be released commercially in October 2011. In addition, Lluberas' is credited as co-composer, along with Christopher Crommett, of the opening song of the «Navidad de mi niñez» CD, entitled "Diciembre, diciembre".

Religious faith
A devout Roman Catholic, Lluberas' religious beliefs are reflected in his musical compositions. He wrote his earliest known piece, "Amén Jíbaro" (1973), to be sung as The Great Amen (The Doxology) in the Roman Catholic Mass. He based many of his songs on the Psalms, the Gospel of Luke and other Biblical texts. He composed "Meditations on Christ: I. On His Gentle Mastery", for flute and piano; "A Christian Musical" («Butterflies in the Rain Forest»); and a celebration of the birth of Christ ("Aguinaldo del Cañaveral").

In several of his paintings and drawings, Lluberas depicted Jesus Christ and Mother Teresa.

After settling in Marietta, Georgia, he became active in two Roman Catholic parishes, Transfiguration and St. Ann. At Transfiguration, he helped start the Respect for Life Ministries whose "womb to tomb" resources would range from pregnancy counseling to caring for the elderly.

Lluberas advocated Perpetual Adoration and the saying of the Rosary.  He was a strong proponent of the power of prayer. He participated in prayer teams at Charismatic movement healing Masses. He led his medical team in prayer when the group was stranded in Belle Anse in the wake of Hurricane Georges. He said later, "the Lord was present all the way, every moment."

During another visit to Belle Anse, Lluberas prayed before he performed a delicate procedure to remove a foreign object embedded in the cornea of an eight-year-old boy's eye. Despite Lluberas' lack of surgical training, the operation was a success and the young patient's sight was saved.

In 2000, Lluberas received the «Lumen Gentium» (Light of the People) award from Transfiguration Catholic Church, "honoring a parishioner who carries Christ's spirit of love and gentleness into the world". Late in his life, Lluberas taught high school catechism.

In the instructions for his funeral Mass, Lluberas asked that the celebrant convey to the congregation that, "all during my illness, I, as a member of the Mystical Body of Christ, was embraced by countless other members of His Body, in such a way that the yoke of my illness became very easy to bear."

References

1956 births
2003 deaths
Puerto Rican expatriates in Haiti
Kennesaw State University people
Puerto Rican Roman Catholic missionaries
Puerto Rican musicians
Puerto Rican composers
Puerto Rican male composers
People from Marietta, Georgia
Puerto Rican rheumatologists
Deaths from cancer in Georgia (U.S. state)
Physicians from Ponce
Writers from Ponce
Christian medical missionaries
Roman Catholic missionaries in Haiti
20th-century American composers
Catholics from Georgia (U.S. state)
20th-century American male musicians
Universidad Central del Caribe alumni
20th-century American clergy